Adebayo "Bayo" O. Ogunlesi CON (born December 20, 1953) is a Nigerian lawyer and investment banker. 
He is currently Chairman and Managing Partner at the private equity firm Global Infrastructure Partners (GIP). 
Ogunlesi was the former head of Global Investment Banking at Credit Suisse First Boston before being promoted to Chief Client Officer and Executive Vice Chairman.

Early life and education
Ogunlesi hails from Makun, Sagamu, Ogun State in Nigeria. He is the son of Theophilus O. Ogunlesi, the first Nigerian professor of medicine at University of Ibadan. His family is of Yoruba origin.

Ogunlesi went to King's College, Lagos, a secondary school in Lagos, Nigeria. He received a B.A. with first class honors in Philosophy, Politics and Economics from Oxford University in  England. In 1979, Ogunlesi received a J.D. magna cum laude from Harvard Law School and an M.B.A. from the Harvard Business School, which he pursued at the same time. During his time at Harvard, he was on the Harvard Law Review.

Career
From 1980 to 1981, Ogunlesi served as a law clerk to Associate Justice Thurgood Marshall of the United States Supreme Court. Ogunlesi was an attorney in the corporate practice group of the New York City law firm of Cravath, Swaine & Moore, where he had been a summer associate while studying for his M.B.A.

In 1983, Ogunlesi joined the investment bank First Boston as an advisor on a Nigerian gas project. At First Boston, he worked in the Project Finance Group, advising clients on transactions and financings and has worked on transactions in North and South America, the Caribbean, Europe, the Middle East, Africa and Asia. From 1997 to 2002, he was the Head of the Global Energy Group of the by then renamed Credit Suisse First Boston (CSFB). In 2002, Ogunlesi was appointed Global Head of CSFB's Investment Banking Division. Also in 2002, he served as a member of Credit Suisse's Executive Board and Management Committee. From 2004 to 2006, Ogunlesi was Executive Vice Chairman and Chief Client Officer of CSFB.

In July 2006, Ogunlesi started the private equity firm, Global Infrastructure Partners (GIP), a joint venture whose initial investors included Credit Suisse and General Electric. He currently serves as Chairman and Managing Partner.

In 2006, GIP bought London City Airport. In 2009, GIP acquired the majority in London Gatwick Airport in a deal worth £1.455 billion. The Nigerian press has given him the nickname, "The Man Who Bought Gatwick Airport." GIP also owns Edinburgh Airport, which they bought in 2012, and Nuovo Trasporto Viaggiatori, which they bought in February 2018.

Additional work 
Ogunlesi is a member of the District of Columbia Bar Association. While working at Credit Suisse First Boston, he was a lecturer at Harvard Law School and the Yale School of Management, where he taught a course on transnational investment projects in emerging countries.

In October 2012, he was appointed to the Board of Directors at Goldman Sachs. On July 24, 2014, he was named Lead Director.

In December 2016, it was announced that Ogunlesi, among other business leaders, would be part of Donald Trump's Strategic and Policy Forum, which was disbanded on Aug 16, 2017.

Personal life 
Ogunlesi has been married to British-born optometrist, Dr. Amelia Quist-Ogunlesi since 1985. They have two children. On the song Wonderful, Burna Boy pays tribute to Adebayo citing his hard work.

Awards and honors
Recipient of The International Center in New York's Award of Excellence. Ogunlesi was cited as one of the Top 100 most influential Africans by New African magazine in 2019.

Works and publications 
  Submitted to: Professor C. Clyde Ferguson, Jr. [for the] Seminar: Legal Problems of the New International Economics Order (Harvard third year paper)

See also 
 Global Infrastructure Partners
 List of law clerks of the Supreme Court of the United States (Seat 10)

References

External links
 Adebayo O. Ogunlesi at Bloomberg L.P.
 Adebayo O. Ogunlesi at Goldman Sachs

1953 births
Living people
People from Sagamu
Harvard Law School alumni
Harvard Business School alumni
Directors of Goldman Sachs
Law clerks of the Supreme Court of the United States
King's College, Lagos alumni
Nigerian investment bankers
Credit Suisse people
Yoruba businesspeople
20th-century Nigerian businesspeople
21st-century Nigerian businesspeople
Yale School of Management faculty
Nigerian expatriate academics in the United States
Cravath, Swaine & Moore people
Carnegie Endowment for International Peace
Nigerian chairpersons of corporations
Alumni of Lincoln College, Oxford
People from Ogun State